The 2017 Australian Super Series was the sixth Super Series badminton tournament of the 2017 BWF Super Series. The tournament took place in Sydney from 20–25 June 2017 with a total purse of $750,000.

Men's singles

Seeds

Top half

Bottom half

Finals

Women's singles

Seeds

Top half

Bottom half

Finals

Men's doubles

Seeds

Top half

Bottom half

Finals

Women's doubles

Seeds

Top half

Bottom half

Finals

Mixed doubles

Seeds

Top half

Bottom half

Finals

References

External links
 Tournament Link
 Official website

Australian Open (badminton)
Australian Super Series
Sports competitions in Sydney
2017 in Australian sport